Alistair Fergus Murray (born 11 September 1942) is a British long-distance runner. He educated at the High School of Dundee and the University of Edinburgh.

He competed in the men's 10,000 metres at the 1964 Summer Olympics.

References

1942 births
Living people
People educated at the High School of Dundee
Alumni of the University of Edinburgh
Athletes (track and field) at the 1964 Summer Olympics
Athletes (track and field) at the 1966 British Empire and Commonwealth Games
British male long-distance runners
Olympic athletes of Great Britain
Place of birth missing (living people)
Universiade bronze medalists for Great Britain
Universiade medalists in athletics (track and field)
Medalists at the 1965 Summer Universiade
Scottish male long-distance runners
Commonwealth Games competitors for Scotland